Bradley Diallo (born 20 July 1990) is a French professional footballer who plays as a defender for Romanian Liga II club FC Brașov. Although he started out as a left back, he developed into a very competent centre back in the second part of his career.

Career

Marseille
He had previously played for Olympique de Marseille, coming up through the youth ranks and making his first competitive start for the club in October 2009. He featured in 4 first team friendly games.

Oldham Athletic
On 19 August 2011, he signed for Oldham Athletic on a five-month contract.
On 20 August 2011, he made his Football League debut as a 90th-minute substitute, coming on for Reuben Reid in a 2–0 victory over rivals Rochdale.
On 3 September 2011, in a game against local rivals Huddersfield Town, Diallo assisted Shefki Kuqi with a pinpoint cross after a run from the left flank but was later shown a straight red card in the 76th minute for a foul on Oscar Gobern.
After serving his suspension Diallo picked up a hamstring injury and was out of action for two and a half months. After recovering he again suffered the same injury in his first match back, due to being rushed into action too quickly. He was taken off after only 14th minutes in a reserves match against Bolton.

RWS Bruxelles
After a successful trial with RWS Bruxelles, Bradley Diallo signed a professional contract with the club in January 2013. He put pen to paper on a 18-month contract with the club, with an option to extend. Bradley Diallo made his debut on 2 February 2013 against Sportkring Sint-Niklaas.

LA Galaxy
Bradley joined the USL Pro team the LA Galaxy II ahead of their inaugural 2014 season. Bradley made his league appearance debut for the LA Galaxy II on 13 April 2014 against fellow USL Pro side Sacramento Republic FC. In 2017, Diallo moved to the first team and played 18 games with LA Galaxy before departing for Liga I club Gaz Metan Mediaș.

Romania
On 17 July 2018, Gaz Metan Mediaș announced the signing of Bradley Diallo.

On 26 June 2019, Politehnica Iași announced the signing of Bradley Diallo.

On 23 January 2020, Diallo signed a one-and-a-half-year contract with Romanian club Chindia Târgoviște.

Finland
On 1 July 2022, Diallo signed with SJK in Finland until the end of 2022.

Personal life
Diallo is of Malian descent.

Honours
FC U Craiova 1948
Liga II: 2020–21

References

External links 
Official club profile at oldhamathletic.co.uk
 at Youtube.com Bradley Showcase Video

Living people
1990 births
Footballers from Marseille
French footballers
French people of Malian descent
Oldham Athletic A.F.C. players
Association football defenders
English Football League players
Olympique de Marseille players
RWS Bruxelles players
LA Galaxy II players
LA Galaxy players
CS Gaz Metan Mediaș players
FC Politehnica Iași (2010) players
AFC Chindia Târgoviște players
FC U Craiova 1948 players
Seinäjoen Jalkapallokerho players
FC Brașov (2021) players
Challenger Pro League players
USL Championship players
Major League Soccer players
Liga I players
Liga II players
French expatriate footballers
Expatriate footballers in England
Expatriate footballers in Belgium
Expatriate soccer players in the United States
Expatriate footballers in Romania
Expatriate footballers in Finland
French expatriate sportspeople in England
French expatriate sportspeople in Belgium
French expatriate sportspeople in the United States
French expatriate sportspeople in Romania
French expatriate sportspeople in Finland
Black French sportspeople